The Eye 3 can refer to the following:

The Eye 10, the third movie of the Asian horror series by The Pang Brothers.
The Eye 3, Asian fantasy-horror by Hark Tsui.